Elections were held in Metro Manila (the National Capital Region) for seats in the House of Representatives of the Philippines on May 9, 2016.

The candidate with the most votes won that district's seat for the 17th Congress of the Philippines.

Summary

Caloocan

1st District
Incumbent representative Enrico Echiverri, who was elected with 47% of the vote in 2013, chose not to seek re-election and will instead run again for mayor. Running for this seat are Dale Gonzalo Malapitan, who lost to Echiverri in 2013, incumbent councilor Susana Punzalan, Garth Gollayan of PDP–Laban, Romualdo Orbe of Partido Bagong Maharlika, and independent candidates Violeta dela Cruz and Glenn Openiano. Malapitan is the son of incumbent Caloocan mayor Oscar Malapitan, who represented this district from 2004 to 2013.

2nd District
First term incumbent Edgar Erice, who was elected with 39% of the vote in 2013, is seeking re-election. He will have a rematch with his 2013 opponent and then-incumbent Mary Mitzi Cajayon-Uy. Also running is Edgardo Espiritu of Partido Bagong Maharlika. Cajayon-Uy represented this district from 2007 to 2013.

Las Piñas
Two-term incumbent Mark Villar, who was re-elected with 90% of the vote in 2013, is seeking a third term.

Makati

1st District
Two-term incumbent Monique Lagdameo, who was re-elected with 71% of the vote in 2013, chose not to seek re-election and will instead run for vice mayor.

Incumbent councilor Maria Concepcion "Ichi" Yabut was supposed to run under the United Nationalist Alliance but later withdrew her candidacy and will instead seek another term as councilor. Actor and incumbent councilor Monsour del Rosario will replace her as UNA's candidate. Running against Del Rosario is Norman Nicholas Garcia of the Liberal Party, Willy Talag of the Nationalist People's Coalition, Eugenia Carreon of PBM, and independent candidate Lourdesiree Latimer.

2nd District
Three-term incumbent Mar-len Abigail Binay, who was re-elected with 83% of the vote in 2013, is barred by term limits from seeking re-election and will instead run for mayor. Her party, the United Nationalist Alliance, nominated her husband, Luis Campos. He will be facing incumbent councilor Israel "Boyet" Cruzado of the Liberal Party, Levi Perez of PBM, and independent candidates Marvin "Vin" Porciuncula and Joel Sarza.

Malabon
Three-term incumbent Josephine Lacson-Noel, who ran unopposed in 2013, is barred by term limits from seeking re-election. Her party, the Nationalist People's Coalition, nominated former representative Federico Sandoval II.

Sandoval represented the now-defunct Malabon-Navotas legislative district from 1998 to 2007. Sandoval will be facing former senator Teresa Aquino-Oreta of the Liberal Party and independent candidate Robin Simon. Oreta, who is an aunt of incumbent President Benigno Aquino III, represented Malabon-Navotas in congress from 1987 to 1998 and served in the Senate from 1998 to 2004.

Mandaluyong
Three-term incumbent and House Majority Leader Neptali Gonzales III, who was re-elected with 89% of the vote in 2013, is barred by term limits from seeking re-election. His party, the Liberal Party, nominated his wife, Alexandra "Queenie" Gonzales. She will be facing Jack Ramel of PDP–Laban and independent candidates Francisco Reyes and Albert Yap.

Manila

1st District
The 1st district is composed of the western part of Tondo. Three-term Liberal Party incumbent Benjamin "Atong" Asilo, who was re-elected with 64% of the vote in 2013, is term-limited and will instead run for vice mayor; his brother Roberto is his party's nominee.

Also running for this district are incumbent three-term councilors Ian "Banzai" Nieva and Ernesto Dionisio, Jr as well as Manny Lopez. Nieva is the son of the late Ernesto "Banzai" Nieva, who represented this district from 1998-2007.

2nd District
The 2nd district is primarily composed of the eastern part of Tondo or also known as Gagalangin sub district. Two-term incumbent Carlo Lopez, who was re-elected with 69% of the vote in 2013, is running for a third term under the Liberal Party.

He is running unopposed because Councilor Numero "Uno" Lim, his supposed opponent, was later nominated by party-list group Tanggal Maralita Inc. (TAMA).

3rd District
The 3rd district is composed of Binondo, Quiapo, San Nicolas, and Santa Cruz. Zenaida "Naida" Angping, who was re-elected with 62% of the vote in 2013, is term-limited and is barred from running again this election. Running to succeed her is her husband, former representative Harry Angping who represented this district from 1998 to 2004.

His opponents are three-term incumbent City Councilor John Marvin “Yul Servo” Nieto and former Councilor Ramon Morales. 
Morales also ran in this district in 2013 and lost receiving only 36% of the vote.

4th District
The 4th district is composed of Sampaloc. Congresswoman Ma. Theresa "Trisha" Bonoan-David, who ran unopposed in 2013, is term-limited and is barred from running again this election. Her party nominated her sister, Annie.

Other candidates for this district are three-term councilor Edward Maceda, one-term councilor Science Reyes, two-term councilor Don Juan "DJ" Bagatsing, former Ateneo basketball player Jobe Nkemakolam.

5th District
The 5th district is composed of Ermita, Malate, Paco (excluding Zone 90), Intramuros, Port Area, and San Andres Bukid (including the Manila South Cemetery). Amado Bagatsing, who was re-elected with 89% of the vote in 2013, is term-limited and is barred from running again this election and will instead run for Mayor. His party's nominee is his daughter Cristal.

Her opponents are former representatives Joey Hizon and Mary Ann Susano as well as incumbent three-term councilor Josie Siscar. 
Joey Hizon represented this district from 1998 to 2007. Meanwhile, Mary Ann Susano represented Quezon City's 2nd Congressional District from 2004 to 2010.

6th District
The  6th district is composed of Paco (Zone 90), Pandacan, Santa Ana, San Miguel, and Santa Mesa. Two-term incumbent Sandy Ocampo, who won re-election in 2013 with 51% of the vote, is seeking a third term. She is co-nominated by NUP and local party KABAKA.

This is the third straight election in which the two candidates are facing each other with Ocampo winning the first two by narrow margins.

Marikina

1st District
Incumbent Representative Marcelino Teodoro, who was re-elected in 2013 unopposed, is term-limited and is barred from running again this election. Incumbent councilor Samuel Ferriol, former Marikina mayor and MMDA Chairman Bayani Fernando, and independent candidate Jopet Sison are running to succeed him.

2nd District
Two-term incumbent Miro Quimbo, who was re-elected with 95% of the vote in 2013, is running for a third term unopposed.

Muntinlupa
Two-term incumbent Rodolfo Biazon, who was re-elected with 75% of the vote in 2013, decided not to file for re-election. His party, the Liberal Party, nominated his son, former Customs Commissioner Ruffy Biazon who represented this district from 2001 to 2010. He will be facing actor and Optical Media Board Chairman Ronnie Ricketts.

On January 29, 2016, the Sandiganbayan suspended Ricketts and three other Optical Media Board personnel due to graft charges in relation to a 2010 incident involving copyright infringing CDs and DVDs.

Navotas
Two-term incumbent Toby Tiangco, who was re-elected with 80% of the vote in 2013, is seeking a third term. He is facing independent candidate Dong Luna.

Parañaque

1st District
First term incumbent Eric Olivarez, who was elected with 63% of the vote in 2013, is seeking a second term. Running against him is Vic Celeridad of Partido Bagong Maharlika.

2nd District
First term incumbent Gus Tambunting, who was elected with 53% of the vote in 2013, is seeking re-election. He will face former representative Roilo Golez, who represented this district from 2004 to 2013, as well as independent candidates Pete Montaño and Pacifico Rosal.

Pasay
Two-term incumbent Imelda Calixto-Rubiano, who was re-elected with 82% of the vote in 2013, is seeking a third term. She will face independent candidate Sonny Quial, Deo Laguipo of Partido Bagong Maharlika and independent candidate Bong Tebelin.

Pasig
Three-term incumbent Roman Romulo, who was re-elected with 88% of the vote in 2013, is barred by term limits from seeking re-election. Incumbent councilors Ricky Eusebio and Christian Sia, and Romulo's sister, Mons Romulo are running to succeed him.

Quezon City
Incumbent representatives from the 2nd, 3rd and 5th legislative districts are running for re-election unopposed.

1st District
First term incumbent Francisco Calalay, who was elected with 51% of the vote in 2013, is seeking a second term. He will be facing former representative Vincent Crisologo who represented this district from 2004 to 2013.

On January 20, 2016, the Office of the Ombudsman found Calalay guilty of falsification of official documents, serious dishonesty, conduct prejudicial to the best interest of the service, and grave misconduct for allegedly hiring ghost employees when he was still a city councilor. This could mean that if Calalay would be disqualified, Crislogo will stand unopposed for election.

2nd District
Two-term incumbent Winston Castelo, who was re-elected with 63% of the vote in 2013, is seeking a third term unopposed.

3rd District
Two-term incumbent Jorge Banal, who was re-elected with 56% of the vote in 2013, is seeking a third term unopposed.

4th District
Two-term incumbent and House Speaker Feliciano Belmonte, who was re-elected with 91% of the vote in 2013, is seeking re-election. He is facing Hadja Lorna Aquino of PBM, and his 2013 opponent, independent candidate Hans Palacios.

5th District
First term incumbent and actor Alfred Vargas, who was elected with 62% of the vote in 2013, is running for a second term unopposed.

6th District
First term incumbent Christopher Belmonte, who was elected in 2013 unopposed, is seeking another term unopposed.

San Juan
First term incumbent and House Minority Floor Leader Ronaldo Zamora, who was elected with 52% of the vote in 2013, is seeking re-election. He will be facing his 2013 opponent, former councilor Jana Ejercito and independent candidate George Cordero.

Taguig and Pateros
Taguig's 1st district and Pateros are grouped together for purposes of electing a member to the House of Representatives. Otherwise, both places have their own local officials.

1st District of Taguig and Pateros
This district is composed of the Municipality of Pateros as well as the eastern half of Taguig. Two-term incumbent Arnel Cerafica, who was re-elected with 68% of the vote in 2013, is seeking re-election. He is facing Gloria Cabrera of PBM.

2nd District of Taguig

First term incumbent Lino Cayetano filed to run for a second term but later withdrew his candidacy. He was substituted by his sister, incumbent two-term Senator Pia Cayetano. She will be facing incumbent councilor Michelle Anne Gonzales.

Valenzuela

1st District
First term incumbent Sherwin Gatchalian, who was elected with 74% of the vote in 2013, chose not to seek re-election and is running for a Senate seat instead. His brother, incumbent Alay Buhay Partylist representative Weslie Gatchalian is running to succeed him. Weslie is running against former councilor Ritche Cuadra who lost to Sherwin in 2013. Also running for the seat is Victor Reponia of PBM.

2nd District
Three-term incumbent Magtanggol Gunigundo, who was re-elected with 51% of the vote in 2013, is barred by term limits from seeking re-election and is running for Mayor instead. His wife, Adelma, is running against incumbent Valenzuela City Vice Mayor Eric Martinez.

References

External links
Official COMELEC results 2016

2016 Philippine general election
Lower house elections in Metro Manila